Michel-Guillaume Baby (September 15, 1834 – March 16, 1911) was a businessman and political figure in Quebec. He represented Rimouski from 1857 to 1861 and Témiscouata from 1861 to 1863 in the Legislative Assembly of the Province of Canada and Chicoutimi et Saguenay from 1874 to 1875 in the Legislative Assembly of Quebec as a Conservative. His name also appears as Michel William Baby.

He was born in Saint-Philippe-de-La Prairie, Lower Canada, the son of Charles François Xavier Baby and Clothilde Pinsonaut. Baby was a shareholder in the Grand Trunk Railway, as well as president of the Quebec and Lake St. John Railway, originally incorporated as the Quebec and Gosford Railway. He was first elected to the legislative assembly for the Province of Canada in an 1857 by-election held after Joseph-Charles Taché resigned his seat. In 1868, he married Marie-Hélène-Wilhelmine, the daughter of Jean-Baptiste Renaud. Baby was first elected to the Quebec assembly in an 1874 by-election held after Pierre-Alexis Tremblay resigned his seat. He did not run for reelection in 1875 and later moved to Paris. Baby died there at the age of 76 and was buried in Quebec City.

External links

References

1814 births
1890 deaths
Conservative Party of Quebec MNAs
Members of the Legislative Assembly of the Province of Canada from Canada East